Martin James Riley (born 5 December 1986) is an English footballer who plays for  side Hednesford Town, where he plays as a defender.

Playing career

Wolverhampton Wanderers
Riley began his career at the age of thirteen with his home-town club Wolverhampton Wanderers. In March 2005, he signed a professional contract with the club but was released in December 2007 without making a single first-team appearance.

Shrewsbury Town
Riley had a short spell with Shrewsbury Town in 2008, but once again didn't feature in the first team.

Kidderminster Harriers
He joined Kidderminster Harriers in the Conference National division in the summer of 2008 where he spent two seasons, he often linked up with fellow centre back Mark Creighton with whom nothing was won trophy wise at Aggborough.

Cheltenham Town
Riley was signed by Cheltenham Town in the summer of 2010. He made his debut for the club on 7 August against Gillingham. On 9 May 2011, Riley was released from Cheltenham after his contract expired.

Mansfield Town
However, on 14 July 2011 Riley signed for Mansfield Town. Riley played 33 times for Mansfield Town scoring once, he also played in the Conference Play-off semi-finals against York City which they lost 2–1 on aggregate.

Wrexham
On 16 July 2012 he signed for Wrexham. This was after Wrexham sold star striker Jake Speight went the opposite way to Mansfield. At The Racecourse Ground Riley would be reunited with former defensive partner from his Aggborough days Mark Creighton, although after just 3 games Creighton suffered a season-ending injury. Riley made his debut in a Conference National game against Woking, Wrexham won 3–1. In March 2013 Riley won his first honour by winning the FA Trophy with Wrexham, beating Grimsby Town on penalties at Wembley.

Return to Mansfield

On 3 June 2013, Riley left Wrexham, returning to former club Mansfield Town on a free transfer. He was released by Mansfield at the end of the 2014–15 season.

Tranmere Rovers
Following his release from Mansfield Town, Riley signed with Tranmere Rovers on 10 June 2015, joining them on 1 July 2015.

Return to Wrexham
On 25 May 2016, Riley returned to Wrexham from Tramere. He played 30 games in the 2016–17 season, and was named Wrexham A.F.C. Player Of The Year, however despite this he was released at the end of the season.

Halifax Town
On 24 May 2016, Riley signed a one-year deal at Halifax Town, becoming their first signing since winning promotion to the National League.

Alfreton Town
In July 2018, Riley joined National League North side Alfreton Town on a one-year deal.

Hereford
On 30 May 2019, he joined Hereford.

Stourbridge
On 21 August 2020, following his departure from Hereford, Riley signed for Southern League Premier Central side Stourbridge on contract terms.

Riley made his debut for Stourbridge on 22 September 2020, in an FA Cup first round fixture at away to Tamworth. Riley was introduced on the 88th minute for Darryl Knights. The game finishing 3-3, and Tamworth went on to won the tie 5-4 on penalties.

Tamworth
On 17 September 2021, Riley signed for Southern League Premier Central rivals Tamworth. The following day Riley was named as an unused substitute in an FA Cup 2nd qualifying round 5-0 away victory over Belper Town. He did make his debut in the next round of the FA Cup on 2 October 2021, as Tamworth defeated Leiston 3-1 away from home, with Riley coming on as an 83rd minute substitute for Jack Thomas.

Riley made his Southern League Premier Central debut for Tamworth on 9 October 2021, when he was called on as a 6th minute substitute for injured former Stourbridge team mate Jordaan Brown, and helped the club to a 2-1 victory, with both goals coming from Dan Creaney in injury time.

Hednesford Town
On 3 December 2021, Riley signed for Southern League Premier Central side Hednesford Town.

Riley confirmed on 29 May 2022 that he would be retiring following the conclusion of the 2021–22 season. However on 13 June 2022 it was confirmed that Riley had a change of heart and agreed a deal to remain with Hednesford Town, and play for the club for the 2022–23 season.

Career statistics

Honours
Wrexham
FA Trophy: 2012–13

Alfreton Town
Derbyshire Senior Cup: 2018–19

References

External links

1986 births
Living people
Footballers from Wolverhampton
English footballers
England semi-pro international footballers
Association football defenders
Wolverhampton Wanderers F.C. players
Shrewsbury Town F.C. players
Kidderminster Harriers F.C. players
Cheltenham Town F.C. players
Mansfield Town F.C. players
Wrexham A.F.C. players
Tranmere Rovers F.C. players
FC Halifax Town players
Alfreton Town F.C. players
Hereford F.C. players
Stourbridge F.C. players
Tamworth F.C. players
Hednesford Town F.C. players
English Football League players
National League (English football) players